The Tower of Castelluchju is a ruined Genoese tower located in the commune of Ajaccio (Corse-du-Sud) off the west coast of the Corsica. The tower sits on the southern end of the Grande Sanguinaire, the largest island in the Îles Sanguinaires archipelago.

The tower was one of a series of coastal defences built by the Republic of Genoa between 1530 and 1620 to stem the attacks by Barbary pirates. The exact year when the tower was built is not known, but it is mentioned in a report written in 1597 for the Genoese authorities by the engineer Britio Tramallo and the lawyer Gieronimo Bonaparte. The report gives the dimensions of three structures on the island: a chapel, a round tower and the surviving small square tower. It sat on the highest point of the Grande Sanguinaire island but was demolished in the 19th century when the existing lighthouse was constructed. In Genoese documents the large round tower was referred to as the Sanguinare di Fuori or the Sanguinare di Mare while the Tour de la Parata was the Sanguinare di Terra.

References

Sources

External links
 Includes information on how to reach 90 towers and many photographs.

Towers in Corsica
Tower of Castelluchju